Castro dei Volsci is a comune (municipality) of 4,702 inhabitants in the Province of Frosinone in the Italian region Lazio, located about  southeast of Rome and about  southeast of Frosinone.

Castro dei Volsci borders the following municipalities: Amaseno, Ceccano, Ceprano, Falvaterra, Lenola, Pastena, Pofi, Vallecorsa and Villa Santo Stefano.

It is the birthplace of the actor Nino Manfredi.

References

 Cities and towns in Lazio